Passiflora tetrandra is a climbing vine found in New Zealand. The Māori name for the plant is kōhia. Other common names include New Zealand passionflower and New Zealand passionfruit.  Of the c.500 species of passionflower, this is the sole representative from New Zealand and endemic to New Zealand.

Kōhia is a forest vine, climbing up to 10m (33 feet). Leaves are alternate, broadly lanceolate, green, shiny, and untoothed. Flowers are small, white to yellow, in groups of 1–3 in the axils of the leaves. Flowers appear between October and December.

Plants are dioecious: fruit may not be produced without female-flowering plants being fertilised with pollen from separate a male-flowering plants. Fruits can be found from summer to autumn; are lemon-shaped, orange, up to 30mm (1.2 inches) long. The fruit can be eaten by people and is a traditional food for Māori: the gum from the stem was also chewed.

Propagation is from seed or cutting. Cultivation requirements are basic: vines need a support structure/tree and a cool root run in a reasonable soil.

References

tetrandra
Dioecious plants
Endemic flora of New Zealand
Vines
Taxa named by Augustin Pyramus de Candolle